The New York State Small Business Development Center was created in 1984.

Mission

The mission of the NYSSBDC is to provide free, one-to-one business advisement and information to existing or aspiring entrepreneurs in New York.  The SBDC also partners with numerous like-minded organizations on projects that advance the job development, investment, and economic growth opportunities of New Yorkers, with an emphasis on manufacturers, exporters and technology-oriented firms.

Regional Centers and Outreach Offices

The NYSSBDC is supported by 24 regional centers and 29 outreach offices located throughout the state.  A listing of all of the NYS SBDC centers and offices is available on the NYS SBDC website.

Small Business Services
The NYSSBDC offers a variety of programs designed to facilitate entrepreneurship and assist small businesses:
Office of Entrepreneurial Education (OE2)
International Business Program
Veterans Business Outreach Program (VBOP)
Disaster Recovery Assistance

History of the SBDC

The Small Business Administration (SBA) is a United States government agency that provides support to small businesses. The SBA was created by way of the Small Business Act of July 30, 1953.  The Small Business Development Center program grew out of the University Business Development Center (UBDC) program.  A 1976 press release announcing the UBDC proclaimed that this new concept "could increase substantially the leverage SBA can provide in counseling and advising small business concerns."  The pilot program for the UBDC was established at California State Polytechnic University at Pomona in 1976.  Throughout 1977 seven more universities received funding, including Georgia, Missouri, Nebraska, and Maine.

By 1979, the UBDC program was renamed the SBDC program, and pilot centers existed at sixteen states across the U.S.  By 1980, performance surveys of SBDC clients, as well as existing small business owners, saw fit to expand the SBDC project throughout the country.  On July 2, 1980, President Carter signed into law the Small Business Development Act of 1980.  This act provided $8.5 million in annual funding.  In 1984, a program was established in New York State.
The SBA in a 1985 report noted that, "Several SBDC's have established separate International Trade Centers (ITC) as part of their state-wide operations.  These international trade centers are currently located in Alabama, Georgia, Mississippi, Arkansas, Louisiana and Pennsylvania.".

An SBDC was established in Guam in 1995 and in May 2000, the 58th SBDC program was established when the SBA funded an SBDC program for American Samoa.  In 2004, federal lawmakers reauthorized the SBDC program for two additional years, at a funding level of $135,000,000.

History of the NYS SBDC

The NYSSBDC Central Office created a Central Library in 1991 to provide reference service to SBDC personnel and manage reference materials.  In 1993 the program hired several information researchers to perform business research and respond to an average of 7,000 information requests annually for SBDCs across the U.S.  In 2001, the newest Regional Center at LaGuardia Community College SBDC was established as part of the program's response to the World Trade Center attacks.

Partners and Sponsors

The NYSSBDC is partnered with various government agencies, business and professional associations, economic development entities, and corporations. The list of NYS SBDC sponsors and partners includes:

Empire State Development Corporation
Department of Education
NYS Banking Department
NYS Insurance Department
Internal Revenue Service
U.S. Environmental Protection Agency
SCORE
New York Business Development Corporation (NYBDC)
The Business Council of New York State, Inc.
Microsoft
International Sign Association
Intuit

See also
SBA 504 Loan
Small Business Administration
Wyoming Small Business Development Center SBDC
SCORE Association
Alabama International Trade Center

References

External links
U.S. Small Business Administration
NYS Small Business Development Center

Small Business Administration
Small business